TV Maria is a national Catholic television channel broadcasting from Manila, Philippines. Owned by TV Maria Foundation Philippines (a non-profit, non-stock organization under the Catholic Bishops' Conference of the Philippines and the Roman Catholic Archdiocese of Manila), it airs 24 hours a day and is currently available on major and provincial cable operators, on digital terrestrial television broadcasts via RJ Digital TV's DTT subchannel in Mega Manila and via GNN's DTT subchannel in selected provincial areas, and via online livestreaming.

Most of the station's programmes are both in-house productions and packaged shows from Jesuit Communications Foundation, Kerygma Foundation, Family Rosary Crusade, Society of St. Paul, and other Catholic groups.

History
The Roman Catholic Church recognizes the importance of keeping up with the times to reach out to a greater number of people. And TV Maria is its means to cater to a Filipino audience who are hungry for God's Word through television as well as through various alternatives such as the internet and the cellphone.

TV Maria Foundation Philippines, Inc. – or simply known as TV Maria – is a non-profit, non-stock religious organization of the Catholic Bishops' Conference of the Philippines through the Roman Catholic Archdiocese of Manila. Its work mainly involves evangelizing the Catholic faith through television and internet broadcasting, plus other forms of modern communication. It promotes not only the importance of communication and information in building a nation but also the importance of interweaving these with Catholic Filipino values.

TV Maria began test broadcasting on January 1, 2006 and began regular transmission on December 4, 2006, the Feast of the Immaculate Conception.

On August 13, 2013, during a press conference for the upcoming Philippine Conference on New Evangelization, Archbishop of Manila Luis Antonio Cardinal Tagle announced that TV Maria finally granted its pay-tv-to-air television franchise from the National Telecommunications Commission.

Starting 2015, TV Maria began to broadcast its Misa Nazareno mass from historic Quiapo Church live via video streaming, as well as certain Papal Masses via EWTN. Since Holy Week 2016, TV Maria also started live broadcasts of Holy Week activities in the Manila Cathedral using widescreen format.

On March 11, 2020, TV Maria was launched on digital terrestrial television on UHF Channel 29 (563.143 MHz) in Metro Manila and surrounding provinces after it signed a partnership deal with Rajah Broadcasting Network.

Current programming

Regular programs
Ang Banal na Orasyon (The Angelus; every 6 am, 12 noon and 6 pm PHT)
Audiam sa RCAM
Baclaran Church First Wednesday Mass
Bukal ng Buhay (Source of Life)
Cat Chat
Charity in Action
Faith Factor
Feast TV
First Things First with Bishop Broderick Pabillo
Kape at Kampay
Happy Momday
Ito ang Kuwento Ko (This is My Story)
Kape't Pandasal (Coffee and Prayer)
Katolikong Pinoy with Dra. Gaines Rosario
Kids Rosary
Know the Truth
Kuwentong Antipolo Pilgrimage
Lakbites
Less is More
Mama's Boys
Manila Cathedral Daily Mass
 Men of Light
Munting Katekismo (Catechism for Kids)
Misa Nazareno: Quiapo Church Daily TV Mass
Once Upon a Saint
OOTD: Out of the Depths (produced by Roman Catholic Diocese of Malolos)
Pagdarasal ng Santo Rosaryo (produced by Our Lady of the Abandoned parish church)
Prayground (produced by Roman Catholic Diocese of Malolos)
Sa Piging ng Panginoon
Salita ng Diyos, Salita ng Buhay (Word of God, Word of Life)
Sambuhay TV Mass
Sensei: Their Skills and Talents
Sto. Niño TV Mass (every second Monday of the month)Sunday Gospel Reflections (co-produced by Paulines and Archdiocese of Palo) TastetimonyThe Chaplet of Divine MercyThe HabitsThe Holy RosaryThe Power to UniteThe Word Exposed by Cardinal Luis Antonio TagleTita Au's CornerTrip ni 'Dre (Father's Trip)Vaticano (from EWTN)Veritas BalitaWhere God Weeps (produced by Aid for the Church in Need)

Special programsHealing Rosary for the World''

See also 
 Catholic television
 Catholic television channels
 Catholic television networks
 Cebu Catholic Television Network
 Padre Pio TV
 Radio Maria

References

External links

Television networks in the Philippines
Television channels and stations established in 2006
Catholic television networks
Religious television stations in the Philippines